An anti-fan, hater, or anti is someone who enjoys writing, discussing or in some cases making derivative works about a piece of media, but solely for the purpose of railing against or parodying it. Someone who opposes a ship (a romantic pairing between two characters) is called an anti-shipper.

It can also be a person with hatred towards a celebrity or icon.

Behaviours
Anti-fandoms appear in many forms from hate-watching to snark.

It is common for large anti-fandoms to gather in groups, usually on forums and sites, to share their mutual aversion. These are coined anti-fan clubs and some are substantial enough to become anti-fan sites.

Behaviours of some anti-fans include doxing, stalking, spreading rumours, stealing their personal belongings or information, abuse or physical harassment.

Examples
In 2006, an anti-fan of the K-pop duo TVXQ poisoned member Yunho with a super glue-laced drink. Instead of pressing charges against the anti-fan, he chose to forgive her, since the girl was the same age as his younger sister. Such occurrences have resulted in an increase of security for celebrities in South Korea.

In 2017, National Post published an editorial describing the 1997–2010 preschool animated series Caillou as "quite possibly the world's most universally reviled children's program," noting "a stunning level of animosity for a series about the relatively uncontroversial daily life of a four-year-old boy." Among the criticisms were the complete lack of educational content in the series, the title character's emotional immaturity, the unfavorable similarities to a younger Charlie Brown, and concerns that the show was portraying Canadians in a poor light and thus "raising a generation of psychopaths." Examples include several "I hate Caillou" pages made on Facebook, numerous parenting blogs criticizing the series, and petitions on Change.org for the show to stop airing. A common criticism towards the series is the "petulant, manipulative and spoiled" behaviour of the titular character, the lack of consequences Caillou is given, and the "poor parenting" presented in the parent characters. As Hopper explained, "This has understandably led to theories that this is an accurate portrayal of Canadian parenting and that Canada is raising a generation of psychopaths. Or that Caillou's parents are so blasted on Canadian weed that they are unable to summon the presence of mind necessary to properly discipline their child." He called the series "a toddler version of Sex and the City or Mad Men," criticizing its lack of educational value: "Unlike most children's programming, Caillou makes almost no attempt to educate its young audience. There are no veiled math problems, spelling lessons or morality tales; it's just calm, non-threatening, bright-coloured people navigating everyday tasks." These criticisms of the show's titular character have been echoed on online platforms, with the formation of anti-Caillou groups online such as "I Hate Caillou" on Facebook and "r/FuckCaillou" on Reddit. On a segment of the late-night talk show Last Week Tonight, host John Oliver hyperbolically exclaimed "Fuck you, Caillou!!! Grow some hair and leave the house!" in a comedic comparison.

The long-running show Barney & Friends (featuring an anthropomorphic purple dinosaur as the title character) was criticized for its incessant cheerfulness and the lack of serious topics in the series. It had also triggered a strong revulsion among people older than its target preschool demographic. The show has been the target of a barrage of often-vicious and dark anti-Barney humor since its debut. W. J. T. Mitchell, a University of Chicago professor who devoted a chapter of his book The Dinosaur Book to the anti-Barney phenomenon, noted: "Barney is on the receiving end of more hostility than just about any other popular cultural icon I can think of. Parents admit to a cordial dislike of the saccharine saurian, and no self-respecting second-grader will admit to liking Barney."

In popular culture
Both the film and TV versions of I Married an Anti-fan were based on the novel of the same name.

Studies
Anti-fan studies include a focus on specific communities of practice and their relationship to the media texts and fans actively marginalizing or discrediting other fans solely on basis of identity (sex, race, etc.).

See also
 Anti-social behaviour
 Cancel culture
 Cyberbullying
 Get Off My Internets
 Ghosting
 Internet troll
 Online shaming
 Sasaeng fan
 Stalking

References

Fandom
Film and video fandom
Hatred
Internet trolling
Music fandom
Media studies
Anti-social behaviour